Azeyevo (or ) is a rural locality (a selo) in Yermishinsky District of Ryazan Oblast, Russia, located on the right bank of the Moksha River. Its population is about eight hundred people, mostly ethnic Tatars.

It was first mentioned in 1527.

The first mosque in Azeyevo was built around 1676. A new mosque was built in 2004.

Notes

Rural localities in Ryazan Oblast
Yelatomsky Uyezd